21000 series may refer to:
Kintetsu 21000 series EMU
Sotetsu 21000 series, an 8-car derivative of the Sotetsu 20000 series EMU